The NeXTcube Turbo is a high-end workstation computer developed, manufactured and sold by NeXT. It superseded the earlier NeXTcube workstation and is housed in the same cube-shaped magnesium enclosure. The workstation runs the NeXTSTEP operating system.

Hardware 

The NeXTcube Turbo is a development of the earlier NeXTcube. It differs from its predecessor in having a 33 MHz 68040 processor.

The NeXTdimension board can also be used in the NeXTcube Turbo.

There was also a very rare accelerator board known as the Nitro; between 5 and 20 are estimated to have been made. It increased the speed of a NeXTcube Turbo by replacing the standard 33 MHz processor with a 40 MHz one.

Specifications

 Display: 1120×832 17" grayscale MegaPixel Display
 Operating System: NeXTSTEP, OPENSTEP
 CPU: 33 MHz 68040 with integrated floating-point unit
 Digital Signal Processor: 25 MHz Motorola DSP56001
 RAM: 16 MB, expandable to 128 MB (Four 72-pin SIMM slots)
 Floppy Drive: 2.88 MB (optional)
 Hard Drive: 400 MB, 1.4 GB or 2.8 GB SCSI drive
 Expansion: four NeXTbus slots (mainboard uses one slot)
 Size (H × W × D): 12" × 12" × 12"

See also 
 NeXT Computer
 NeXTcube
 NeXTstation
 NeXT character set

References

External links 
 old-computers.com — NeXTcube
 NeXTComputers.org

Computer workstations
NeXT
History of the Internet
Steve Jobs
68k-based computers